St. George's Austrian High School is a private Austrian-Turkish high school located in Karaköy, Beyoğlu, Istanbul, Turkey. It is one of several secondary schools that were founded by European or American missions in Turkey during the 19th century, but were then secularized after the founding of the modern Turkish Republic in 1923.

Today, the school is subject to regulation by the Turkish Ministry of National Education, and almost its entire student body is Turkish, but a large part of its administrative and teaching staff remains Austrian (appointed by the Austrian Ministry of Education, Arts and Culture), and it offers a mixture of Turkish and Austrian curricula in a bilingual environment.

History 

Sankt Georg was founded in 1882 by Austrian Lazarists and was originally intended for German-speaking Catholic children living in the Ottoman Empire. After the Ottoman (and Austrian) defeat in World War I, the school was ordered closed by the occupying Triple Entente forces in Istanbul, and all of its staff was sent back to Austria. The school was reopened shortly afterwards when the Republic of Turkey was founded (1923). After the annexation of Austria by the Nazi Germany in 1938, the school turned into a "German school" and it was closed once again in 1944, due to the freezing of relations between Turkey and Germany. It was reopened in 1947. In 1995, the girls' and boys' schools were merged.

Curriculum 
The school combines both the Austrian and the Turkish curricula to prepare its students for the Turkish and Austrian school leaving examinations and to enrich their general knowledge. Under the current curriculum, students at Sankt Georg can learn up to three foreign languages. German and English are the two compulsory foreign languages taught at Sankt Georg. Aside from these two languages, students can choose either Latin or French as their third foreign language. Most subjects (including math, sciences, philosophy and arts) are taught in German by Austrian teachers, but subjects related to Turkish culture and language (such as Turkish literature, history and geography) are taught in Turkish by Turkish teachers. Students learn German in a compulsory one-year preparatory program.

School-leaving qualifications offered 
 Turkish high school diploma (Lise diploması)
 Austrian Matura: Students wishing to pursue their tertiary education at universities in Austria, or in the European Union, have the right to sit the Austrian Reifeprüfung examination at Sankt Georg. Once students pass the examination, they obtain the Matura certificate, which is equivalent to International Baccalaureate (IB).

School library 

The current school library opened in 1988, after 2 small libraries within the school building were brought together. As of 2020, it contains more than 26,000 books, 20 periodicals/magazines in Turkish, German and English, and CDs/DVDs.

Alumni 
Alumni of Sankt Georg gather every year in the last week of April at a re-union called "Strudeltag". Another annual re-union is organised around May in Vienna, which is intended for the graduates of Sankt Georg living/studying in Austria or in other European countries.

Notable alumni

List sorted in alphabetical order of surnames:

 Ian F. Akyildiz, Ken Byers Chair Professor in Telecommunications, Georgia Institute of Technology, Atlanta, GA, USA.
 Aret Güzel Aleksanyan, founder of Vienna Interkul Theater (Wiener Interkul Theater), 2008 Vienna City Gold Medal for Outstanding Service
 Zerrin Arbaş, actress and Best Model of Turkey 1965
 Defne Ayas, Museum Director, Renowned Curator
 Cenk Aydin, Young Global Leader, Banker and Entrepreneur
 Rutkay Aziz, actor and director
 Zeyno Baran, Senior Fellow at the Hudson Institute
 Enis Berberoğlu, Chief editor of the Hürriyet daily
 Gültekin Çizgen, photography artist
 Cansu Demirci, actress
 Kenan Ece, actor
 Burak Elmas, president of the sports club Galatasaray S.K.
 Ufuk Esin, archaeologist
 Leyla Gediz, painter, arts exhibition curator
 Ömer Göksel, composer, jazz musician
 Meral Güneyman, musician and pianist
 Mehmet Gürel, writer, singer
 Zeynep Damla Gürel, Special advisor to the head of state in European affairs; former deputy of Republican People's Party (CHP)
 Tunç Hamarat, World Correspondence Chess Champion 1999-2004
 Ediz Hun, actor and MP
 Mustafa Iscel, ÖVP MP
 Mine Ayşe Karamehmet, founder of the art schools; Atölyedans and Atölyemüzik
 Mustafa Koç, businessman
 Alev Korun, the first Turkish MP in the Austrian Parliament
 Petros Markaris, Greek-Armenian author
 Mehmetcan Mincinozlu, actor
 Ulaş Moğultay, Board Member at Türkiye İş Bankası A.Ş. Group
 İlber Ortaylı, historian
 Fatih Ozguven, author, literary translator and columnist
 Tezer Özlü, translator and writer
 Murat Ses, musician and keyboard player, founding member of Moğollar
 Nijad Sirel, writer
 Ahmet Tulgar, writer and journalist
 Merva Ulusoy, program editor and presenter for the show Headquarters on CNN Türk news channel
 Mesut Yılmaz, former prime minister of Turkey

See also

 List of high schools in Turkey
 Education in the Ottoman Empire

References

External links

 Sankt Georg Avusturya Lisesi Student's Portal
 Official website of Sankt Georg Avusturya Lisesi
 
 Other Austrian schools around the world

Austrian diaspora
German diaspora
International schools in Turkey
High schools in Istanbul
Educational institutions established in 1882
Beyoğlu
1882 establishments in the Ottoman Empire